John Curtin (1885–1945) was an Australian prime minister.

John Curtin may also refer to:

John I. Curtin (1837–1911), American Civil War general
John Curtin (American politician) (1865–1925), California state senator
John Thomas Curtin (1921–2017), U.S. federal judge
John Curtin (footballer) (1924–2019), Australian rules footballer for St Kilda

See also
John Curtin College of the Arts, high school in Fremantle, Western Australia
John Curtin School of Medical Research, part of Australian National University
John McCurtin (1896–1982), Irish Cumann na nGaedheal TD and prisoner